Álvaro Martín may refer to:

 Álvaro Martín (racewalker) (born 1994), Spanish racewalker
 Álvaro Martín (footballer) (born 2001), Spanish footballer
 Álvaro Martín (sports announcer), Puerto Rican commentator